Târgului River may refer to:
 Râul Târgului, a tributary of the Râul Doamnei in Argeș County, Romania
 Târgul, a tributary of the river Șomuzul Mare in Suceava County, Romania
 Râul Târgului, a tributary of the Suceava in Suceava County, Romania